Nowa Wieś  is a village in the administrative district of Gmina Zębowice, within Olesno County, Opole Voivodeship, in south-western Poland.

References

Villages in Olesno County